The 1996 South American Cross Country Championships took place on February 24–25, 1996.  The races were held at the Club Mbiguá in Asunción, Paraguay.

Complete results, results for junior and youth competitions, and medal winners were published.

Medallists

Race results

Senior men's race (12 km)

Note: Athletes in parentheses did not score for the team result.  (n/s: nonscorer)

Junior (U20) men's race (8 km)

Note: Athletes in parentheses did not score for the team result.  (n/s: nonscorer)

Youth (U17) men's race (4 km)

Note: Athletes in parentheses did not score for the team result.  (n/s: nonscorer)

Senior women's race (6 km)

Note: Athletes in parentheses did not score for the team result.  (n/s: nonscorer)

Junior (U20) women's race (4 km)

Note: Athletes in parentheses did not score for the team result.  (n/s: nonscorer)

Youth (U17) women's race (3 km)

Note: Athletes in parentheses did not score for the team result.  (n/s: nonscorer)

Medal table (unofficial)

Note: Totals include both individual and team medals, with medals in the team competition counting as one medal.

Participation
According to an unofficial count, 108 athletes from 7 countries participated.

 (34)
 (17)
 (1)
 (12)
 (3)
 (32)
 (9)

See also
 1996 in athletics (track and field)

References

External links
 GBRathletics

South American Cross Country Championships
South American Cross Country Championships
South American Cross Country Championships
International athletics competitions hosted by Paraguay
Cross country running in Paraguay
February 1996 sports events in South America